Brianna Henries (born February 27, 1991) is an American politician and esthetician serving as a member of the Rhode Island House of Representatives from the 64th district. Elected in November 2020, she assumed office on January 5, 2021.

Early life and education 
Henries was born in Providence, Rhode Island and raised in Warwick. After graduating from Classical High School in 2009, she earned certifications from the Make-up Designory and the Elizabeth Grady School of Esthetics and Massage Therapy.

Career 
Outside of politics, Henries has worked as a theater teacher with Valiant Arts Studio and as a retail manager and makeup artist with Bare Minerals. She was elected to the Rhode Island House of Representatives in November 2020 and assumed office on January 5, 2021.

References 

Living people
1991 births
People from Providence, Rhode Island
People from Warwick, Rhode Island
People from East Providence, Rhode Island
American make-up artists
Democratic Party members of the Rhode Island House of Representatives
African-American state legislators in Rhode Island
Women state legislators in Rhode Island